HD 202628 is a single star in the southern constellation of Microscopium. It has an apparent visual magnitude of +6.7, which makes it too faint to be readily visible to the naked eye. The star is located at a distance of 77.7 light years from the Sun based on parallax, and it is drifting further away with a radial velocity of +12.1 km/s. The absolute magnitude of this star is 4.86.

The stellar classification of HD 202628 is G1.5V, matching a yellow-hued G-type main-sequence star similar to the Sun. The chromospheric activity level and amount of X-ray emission is consistent with a star that is younger than the Sun. It is spinning with a projected rotational velocity of 2.6 km/s. The star has 107% of the mass of the Sun and 95% of the Sun's radius. The metallicity, or abundance of heavier elements, appears to be about the same as in the Sun. It is radiating 95% of the luminosity of the Sun from its photosphere at an effective temperature of 5,843 K.

In 2010, an infrared excess from a circumstellar disk of dust was detected around this star by the Spitzer Space Telescope. The net emission at 70 microns (70 μm) is almost 20 times as high as the star's flux at this wavelength. The disk has been directly imaged by the Hubble Space Telescope. It is oval-shaped with an orbital eccentricity of 0.18, and is inclined at 64° to the line of sight from the Earth. The inner edge of the ring, which lies at around 158 AU from the star, is sharply defined. This suggests that there is an exoplanet responsible for this defined edge, and it has been calculated as orbiting between 86 and 158 AU from HD 202628.

References

G-type main-sequence stars
Circumstellar disks
Hypothetical planetary systems

Microscopium
Durchmusterung objects
0825.2
202628
105184